Hwa Nan College,  or Women's College of South China, was a Christian institution of higher education in Fujian, China. and was located in Fuzhou, but moved to Nanping during the Second Sino-Japanese War.

References

Christian colleges in China
Universities and colleges in Fujian
Defunct universities and colleges in China
Women's universities and colleges in China
Education in Fuzhou
Nanping